
Gmina Górzno is an urban-rural gmina (administrative district) in Brodnica County, Kuyavian-Pomeranian Voivodeship, in north-central Poland.

The gmina contains part of the protected area called Górzno-Lidzbark Landscape Park.

Villages
Apart from the town of Górzno, Gmina Górzno contains the villages and settlements of Czarny Bryńsk, Fiałki, Gołkowo, Górzno-Wybudowanie, Miesiączkowo, Szczutowo, Szynkówko and Zaborowo.

Neighbouring gminas
Gmina Górzno is bordered by the gminas of Bartniczka, Lidzbark, Lubowidz and Świedziebnia.

References

Polish official population figures 2006

Gorzno
Brodnica County